The first general census of the population of the Russian Empire in 1897 was the first and only nation-wide census performed in the Russian Empire (excluding the Grand Duchy of Finland). Previously, the Central Statistical Bureau issued statistical tables based on fiscal lists (ревизские списки).

The census revealed the social class, native language, religion, and profession of citizens, which were aggregated to yield district and provincial totals.

The second Russian Census was scheduled for December 1915, but was cancelled because of World War I, which had begun during 1914. It was not rescheduled before the Russian Revolution. The next census in Russia only occurred at the end of 1926, almost three decades later.

Organization
The census project was suggested during 1877 by Pyotr Semenov-Tyan-Shansky, a famous Russian geographer and director of the Central Statistical Bureau, and was approved by Czar Nicholas II in 1895.

The census was performed in two stages. For the first stage (December 1896 — January 1897) the counters (135,000 persons: teachers, priests, and literate soldiers) visited all households and filled in the questionnaires, which were verified by local census managers. For the second stage the counters simultaneously visited all households to verify and update the questionnaires. The census was performed during winter as the population was less mobile then. Despite this being the only imperial census, historians are able to estimate the Russian Empire's population during earlier times by collecting city censuses.

The data processing required 8 years using Hollerith card machines. Publication of the results started during 1898 and ended in 1905. In total, 119 volumes for 89 guberniyas, as well as a two-volume summary, were issued.

Data fields
The questionnaire contained the following questions:
Family name, given name, patronymic or nickname (прозвище)
Sex
Relation with respect to the head of the family or household
Age
Marital status
Social status: sosloviye (estate of the realm), rank or title (сословіе, состояніе, званіе)
Place of birth
Place of registration
Usual place of residence
Notice of absence
Faith
First language (родной язык)
Literacy
Occupation (profession, trade, position of office or service), both primary and secondary

In the census summary tables, nationality was based on the declared primary language of respondents.

Census results
The total population of the Russian Empire was recorded to be 125,640,021 people, 62,477,348 or 49.73% of whom were men and 63,162,673 or 50.27% were women—the median age was 21.16 years.

By native language

By religion

Population by modern-day countries

 Russia 67,476,000 (from this Siberia 5,758,822)
 Ukraine 23,430,407 (from this Crimea 1,447,790)
 Poland (Vistula basin) 9,402,253
 Belarus 6,927,040
 Kazakhstan 4,000,000
 Lithuania 3,135,771
 Georgia 2,109,273
 Uzbekistan 2,000,000
 Moldova 1,935,412
 Latvia 1,929,387
 Azerbaijan 1,705,131
 Estonia 900,000
 Armenia 797,853
 Kyrgyzstan 750,000
 Tajikistan 646,000
Turkmenistan 350,000

Largest cities 

Largest cities of the Empire according to the census:

 Saint Petersburg – 1,264,900
 Moscow – 1,038,600
 Varshava (Warsaw) – 626,000
 Odessa – 403,800
 Lod (Łódź) – 314,000
 Riga – 282,200
 Kiev (Kyiv) – 247,700
 Kharkov (Kharkiv) – 174,000
 Tiflis (Tbilisi) – 159,600
 Vilna (Vilnius) – 154,500
 Saratov – 137,100
 Kazan – 130,000
 Rostov-on-Don – 119,500
 Tula – 114,700
 Astrakhan – 112,900
 Ekaterinoslav (Dnipro) – 112,800
 Baku – 111,900
 Chișinău – 108,500
 Helsinki – 93,000
 Nikolayev (Mykolaiv) – 92,000
 Minsk – 90,900
 Nizhny Novgorod – 90,100
 Samara – 90,000
 Orenburg – 72,400
 Yaroslavl – 71,600
 Dvinsk (Daugavpils) – 69,675
 Vitebsk – 65,900
 Reval (Tallinn) – 64 572
 Libava (Liepāja) – 64,489
 Yekaterinodar (Krasnodar) – 65,600
 Tsaritsyn (Volgograd) – 55,200

Data availability 
Each enumeration form was copied twice, with the three copies filed in the Volost (county) archives, the governorate archives, and the Central Statistical Bureau in St. Petersburg. The copies in St. Petersburg were destroyed after they had been tabulated. Most of the copies stored locally and regionally have also been destroyed; however, the complete census for the Arkhangelsk and Tobolsk governorates has been preserved, and the census for portions of several other governorates is also extant.

Assessment 
The results may have been influenced by national policy of the authorities: the population of Russian ethnicity was somewhat exaggerated. Thus for example, the number of Poles is underrepresented. Imperial officials classified the Ukrainian and Belarusian languages as belonging to the Russian group and labeled those nationalities as Little Russian for Ukrainians and White Russian for Belarusians.

The census did not contain a question on ethnicity, which was deduced from data on mother tongue, social estate and occupation. There was also a 1916 and 1917 "agricultural census" that was carried out throughout the empire (except in some parts of the Caucasus, Eastern Russia, and Siberia), and a 1920 "general census" (except in the Russian far north, far east, Ukraine, and the Caucasus).

Notes

References

Bibliography 

Первая всеобщая перепись населенiя Россійской Имперіи. Под редакцiею Н. А. Тройницкаго. — СПб.: Изданiе центральнаго статистическаго комитета министерства внутреннихъ делъ, 1905. (The First Total Census of Russian Empire. A publication of the central statistical bureau of the Ministry of Internal Affairs. Editor N. A. Toynitsky.)
 РОССИЯ. Полное Географическое Описание Нашего Отечества. Под ред. П. П. Семенова-Тян-Шанского. — СПб., 1913. (Semenov-Tyan-Shanskiy, P. P. (Ed.): RUSSIA. Complete Geographical Description of our Fatherland. — St. Petersburg, 1913. This latter work reproduces most of the results of the census, and is a good deal easier to find in western libraries than the original publication.)
Первая всеобщая перепись населения Российской Империи 1897 г. Распределение населения по родному языку и регионам (First General Russian Empire Census of 1897. Population breakdown by mother tongue and regions) (Demoscope.ru) 
The First General Census of the Russian Empire of 1897. Breakdown of population by mother tongue and districts in 50 Governorates of the European Russia (1777 territorial units)

Other websites
 A website containing an interactive map with native language, religion, and urbanization data for each Russian district (uyezd) in the 1897 Russian census for a district's total population, urban population, and rural population

Society of the Russian Empire
Demographics of Russia
Censuses by country
1897 in the Russian Empire
Russian Empire